Alıcık can refer to:

 Alıcık, Merzifon
 Alıcık, Şenkaya